David Liss (born March 16, 1966) is an American writer of novels, essays and short fiction; more recently working also in comic books. He was born in New Jersey and grew up in South Florida. Liss received his BA degree from Syracuse University, an MA from Georgia State University and his M. Phil from Columbia University. He left his post-graduate studies of 18th Century British literature and unfinished dissertation to write full-time. "If things had not worked out with fiction, I probably would have kept to my graduate school career track and sought a job as a literature professor," he said. A full-time writer since 2010, Liss lives in San Antonio, Texas, with his wife and children.

Most of Liss' novels are historical-mystery (or historical-thriller) novels. Settings include 18th-century London and America and 17th-century Amsterdam. One novel, The Ethical Assassin, is a modern mystery-thriller. His first book, A Conspiracy of Paper (2000), won the 2001 Edgar Award for Best First Novel. A member of the International Thriller Writers, he is a regular attendee at Bouchercon and Thrillerfest.

Works

Novels
 A Conspiracy of Paper (2000)
 The Coffee Trader (2003)
 A Spectacle of Corruption (2004)
 The Ethical Assassin (2006)
 The Whiskey Rebels (2008)
 The Devil's Company (2009)
 The Twelfth Enchantment (2011)
 The Day of Atonement (2014)
 Randoms (2015)
 Rebels (2016)
 Renegades (2017)
 Spider-Man: Hostile Takeover (2018)
 The Peculiarities (2021)

Short fiction
 "The Double Dealer", in the anthology Thriller.
 "What Maisie Knew", in the anthology The New Dead, edited by Christopher Golden. 
 "Watchlist: A Serial Thriller".  (Collaborator)
 "A Bad Season for Necromancy", in the anthology Four Summoner's Tales. 
 "Hollow Choices", with Robert Jackson Bennett, first published in Dark Duets: All-New Tales of Horror and Dark Fantasy, Harper Voyager, 2014
 "Dead Man's Pecker", first published in Dark Discoveries, issue #26, 2014

Comic books
 The Daring Mystery Comics 70th Anniversary Special, featuring The Phantom Reporter, published by Marvel Comics (January 2010)
 Black Panther: The Man Without Fear (which became Black Panther: The Most Dangerous Man Alive) #513–529, ongoing series, published by Marvel Comics (February 2011 – April 2012)
 Mystery Men, 5-issue limited series with Patrick Zircher, published by Marvel Comics (August–November 2011) tpb: hardcover , soft cover 
 The Spider, comic book series, with Colton Worley, published by Dynamite Entertainment (May 2012 – March 2014)
 The Shadow Now, 6-issue limited series, with Colton Worley, Dynamite Entertainment (October 2013 – April 2014)
 Sherlock Holmes: Moriarty Lives, 5-issue limited series, with Daniel Indro, published by Dynamite Entertainment (December 2013 – July 2014)

Further reading 
Art at Our Doorstep: San Antonio Writers and Artists featuring David Liss. Edited by Nan Cuba and Riley Robinson (Trinity University Press, 2008).

References

External links

 Official website

1966 births
Living people
21st-century American novelists
American historical novelists
American mystery writers
Columbia University alumni
Edgar Award winners
Georgia State University alumni
Syracuse University alumni
Novelists from Florida
Novelists from New Jersey
Writers from San Antonio
Jewish American novelists
Macavity Award winners
Barry Award winners
American male novelists
21st-century American male writers
Novelists from Texas
21st-century American Jews